The SS City of London was a passenger steamship built in Glasgow, Scotland, in 1863 by Tod & McGregor, and owned by the Inman Line. 

She had a single funnel, and three masts.

She completed her maiden voyage from Liverpool, to Queenstown, and then to New York on 29 September 1870. She carried immigrants from Liverpool to New York for many years.

In 1878 she was purchased by the Thistle Line.

In November 1881, 41 people died when she was lost at sea on passage from London to New York.

References

Passenger ships of the United Kingdom
1863 ships